Bradburia is a North American genus of flowering plants in the family Asteraceae, native to the southern United States.

The genus is named for British naturalist John Bradbury, 1768–1823.

 Species
 Bradburia hirtella Torr. & A.Gray - Texas, Louisiana
 Bradburia pilosa (Nutt.) Semple - southeastern + south-central United States

References

Asteraceae genera
Flora of the Southern United States
Astereae